Meedhoo, as a place name, may refer to one of the following locations in the Republic of the Maldives:
 Meedhoo (Dhaalu Atoll)
 Meedhoo (Raa Atoll)
 Meedhoo (Addu)